National Christian Council may refer to:

 National Christian Council of China
 National Christian Council in Japan